Rosita Vai (born 4 June 1981) is a New Zealand singer who rose to musical fame as the winner of the second season of New Zealand Idol in 2005. Now married, she is also known as Rosita Gibbons. Prior to her win, Rosita managed to stay out of the "bottom three" placings for the entire competition, the only contestant to have done so in the history of NZ Idol. The very first female crowned New Zealand Idol, she also appeared on TV2's Showstoppers and Pop's Ultimate Star, which featured various winners from New Zealand Idol and PopStars; however, she was voted out in the second week of the competition.

After she won Idol, entertainer Sir Howard Morrison made comments about Vai's large body size, saying it would affect her career and give the wrong image to her fans. Morrison and Vai reconciled on the TVNZ television show Close Up, and the two performed a duet together at a live concert in 2006.

Like NZ Idol season one winner Ben Lummis, Vai is no longer signed to SonyBMG. She released an album titled Golden which made the Top 20 NZ Albums chart. She also won a Tui Award for Best Selling Single for her #1 hit "All I Ask" - her winners single for NZ Idol. She was nominated as the best female artist at the Pacific Music awards 2006.

She is of Samoan ethnicity and performed at the opening ceremony of the 2007 Pacific Games, held in Apia, Samoa. The songstress expanded her skills to include musical theatre with her debut in Sinarella, a Pacific interpretation of the classic fairytale Cinderella in 2012, quickly followed by a 2013 season of Auckland Theatre Company's rock comedy The Little Shop of Horrors. Vai spent the majority of 2014 globe trotting as part of the ensemble cast of the critically acclaimed The Factory, created by Kila Kokonut Krew company – a nod to Pacific migration into Aotearoa during the 1960s and early 1970s. The Factory performed to sell-out audiences including the Edinburgh Fringe Festival. Vai's vocals have enabled her to collaborate with some of New Zealand's most talented musicians including Dame Malvina Major, Sir Howard Morrison, Bella Kalolo and Aaradhna. With a deep sense of pride in her heritage, Vai combines her Pacific culture with her classical training and a fusion of soul, gospel, hip hop and R&B to create music that a diverse audience can appreciate. Vai is now signed up with Soul Note Agency run by Te Awanui Reed of Nesian Mystics and is working on the edgy rock-opera Jesus Christ Superstar in Auckland, NZ.

The singer released her single and video clip "Koko Rice" in 2015. Later in the same year she released her debut EP Everything's Rosie in 2015. She was nominated again in 2016 for best female artist at the Vodafone Pacific Music awards. Vai now resides in Sydney, working in the entertainment industry while working on new music.

Early life
Vai was born in Wellington, brought up by her grandmother whom she acknowledges as one of the main influences in her life. She started singing at a very young age, at church and within family gatherings. Her parents were the caretakers of Wesley Methodist Church, on Taranaki St in Wellington. Vai's mother Niutao was a secretary, and her father Peniamina a mechanic. In 1986, Vai's parents found an opportunity in Auckland and decided to start afresh on the North Shore to bring up their girls. At the age of seven, Vai started learning the piano with a neighbour and at that very moment knew she wanted to be a songwriter. By the age of 10, Vai had won many prestigious awards on the North Shore and Auckland under the classical trained direction of her teacher Shirley Fowler. At the age of 12, Vai joined her school rock band, at Takapuna Intermediate School, where she was scouted by conductor and choral director Elise Bradley who now runs the Toronto Children's Choir. At age 13, Vai won a scholarship to study classical singing which allowed her to attend Westlake Girls High School, on the North Shore. Vai studied under the direction of Isabel Barnes, Beatrice Webster and Sheila Richardson. Vai travelled abroad to Argentina, Hawaii, Sydney with her school choir Key Cygnetures who were invited to many musical festivals which inspired her to audition for The New Zealand Youth Choir. She had just finished auditioning also for a placement at the University of Auckland for the performing arts degree in classical singing - Vai had been short listed and successfully gained admission to study performance music. At the end of Vai's second year at university she decided to hold her studies as she had bigger dreams. She wanted to pursue her singer songwriting dream in the music industry.

References

External links
Facebook
"Igelese Ete - SPG 2007 Official Theme Song 'Live the Dream'". YouTube

1981 births
Living people
New Zealand Idol participants
Idols (TV series) winners
Musicians from Wellington
New Zealand people of Samoan descent
21st-century New Zealand women singers
People educated at Westlake Girls High School